Andrew Josef Feinstein (born 16 March 1964) is a South African former politician who currently resides in the United Kingdom.

Early life and education
Andrew Feinstein was born in Cape Town to Jewish parents Josef Feinstein and Erika Hemmer. Nearly 40 members of Hemmer's family were murdered during the Holocaust, whilst she herself hid from the Nazis in Vienna.

Feinstein graduated from Wynberg Boys' High School in Cape Town in 1981; he then attended the University of Cape Town, the University of California at Berkeley, and King's College, Cambridge.

African National Congress
A member of the African National Congress (ANC), his political life began when he served as a Member of the Gauteng Provincial Legislature and an advisor to Gauteng's then-MEC of Finance, Jabu Moleketi, from 1994 to 1996. He also worked as an economic advisor to then-premier Tokyo Sexwale. He was elected as a member of the South African Parliament's lower house in 1997. He was the first South African MP to introduce a motion relating to the Holocaust.

During his time in office, he served on the Finance Committee, and chaired the sub-committee that drafted the Public Finance Management Act (Act 1 of 2000), as chair of the ANC study group on public accounts and the ANC's official spokesman on the National Assembly's public accounts committee. Feinstein was at the time referred to as "one of its most vocal and talented MPs", who argued that a thorough investigation into the South African Arms Deal had to be done. However, he resigned in 2001 when the ANC refused to launch an unfettered investigation into the matter. He was succeeded by Geoff Doidge in both positions.

Post-political career
He now resides in London, where he is Executive Director of Corruption Watch UK and chaired the Aids charity Friends of the Treatment Action Campaign, and lectures and writes on South Africa and the global arms trade. He is now considered an ANC dissident and critic, with his memoirs, After the Party, being severely critical of the political culture of the ANC. He describes the ill-fated arms deal as the "point at which the ANC lost its moral compass".

In an interview with Democracy Now!, he noted the ways in which the global arms trade was linked to the Sandy Hook Elementary School shooting.

About l'affaire Dadak, concerning the activities of a Franco-Polish arm dealer Pierre Dadak, Feinstein stated: "Dadak's story reflects the complete amoral nature of the arms trade. The distinction between arms dealers and grifters is extremely fuzzy. A lot of these people are almost caricatures, they have huge personalities, they’re delusional. The extraordinary thing is how company after company, government after government, actually fall for these people. And the reason they do it is because everything that happens in this trade is secret, so it provides absolutely fertile ground for these sorts of conmen".

Feinstein is a member of the British Labour Party. In December 2019, along with 42 other leading cultural figures, Feinstein signed a letter endorsing the Labour Party under Jeremy Corbyn's leadership in the 2019 general election. The letter stated that "Labour's election manifesto under Jeremy Corbyn's leadership offers a transformative plan that prioritises the needs of people and the planet over private profit and the vested interests of a few."

In December 2020, he described Sir Keir Starmer, Corbyn's successor as the Labour Party leader, as "inauthentic" and "severely lacking in charisma".

A staunch critic of the nature and regulation of the global arms trade, Feinstein is a board member of Declassified UK, an investigative journalism website set up in 2019 by Matt Kennard and Mark Curtis to cover the UK's role on the international stage.

Shadow World

In 2011 Feinstein published The Shadow World: Inside the Global Arms Trade, an investigation into the global arms industry published internationally by Penguin in 2011 and 2012 and in the United States by Farrar, Straus, Giroux. The Washington Post described the book as "A comprehensive treatment of the arms trade, possibly the most complete account ever written."  The Independent said of it: "one thing that has been missing has been a comprehensive book for the more general reader, along the lines of Anthony Sampson's The Arms Bazaar, back in the late 1970s. Andrew Feinstein's The Shadow World does just this, and in some ways it is even better than Sampson's influential volume. What is particularly useful is the very unusual combination of a thoroughly readable book that also provides a quite extraordinary range of sources - some 2,500 footnotes in all." Feinstein reported "that the trade in weapons accounts for around 40 percent of all corruption in all world trade The...trade in weapons is extremely closely tied into the mechanics of government. The defence manufacturers, those who make the weapons, are closely tied in to governments, to militaries, to intelligence agencies and crucially to political parties."

The book was made into a feature documentary, Shadow World, by Louverture Films, directed by the Belgian Johan Grimonprez. Feinstein co-wrote the film and features in it. The film premiered at the Tribeca Film Festival in 2016 and won Best Documentary Feature Film at the Edinburgh International Film Festival in 2016, Tiempo de Historia Award (Best Documentary) Semana Internacional de Cine de Valladolid 2016, and Ensor Best Documentary at the Ostend Film Festival 2017. It was screened at the Wales One World Film Festival in March 2017.

Personal life
Feinstein married Simone Sultana on 18 December 1993; the couple have a son and a daughter. His interests include reading, classical music and theatre.

Books
After the Party: A Personal and Political Journey Inside the ANC (2007)
The Shadow World: Inside the Global Arms Trade (2011)

References

External links
Profile of and editorials by Feinstein on The Guardian

21st-century non-fiction writers
21st-century memoirists
21st-century South African non-fiction writers
South African political writers
Jewish non-fiction writers
Non-fiction crime writers

Anti-corruption activists
South African anti-corruption activists
Jewish activists
Jewish South African anti-apartheid activists
White South African anti-apartheid activists
African National Congress politicians
Members of the National Assembly of South Africa
Politicians from Cape Town
South African businesspeople
University of Cape Town alumni
University of California, Berkeley alumni
Alumni of King's College, Cambridge
Alumni of Wynberg Boys' High School
South African expatriates in England
South African Jews
1964 births
Living people